Mark J. Albrecht (born March 10, 1950) is a senior aerospace and telecommunications executive with broad government and industry experience. He completed his BA and MA from UCLA (Phi Beta Kappa) and PhD from the Pardee RAND Graduate School. He was the executive secretary of the National Space Council from 1989–1992 and was the principal advisor to President George H. W. Bush on space. He was the Legislative Assistant for National Security Affairs to United States Senator Pete Wilson of California from 1983–1989. Albrecht was a senior executive at SAIC from 1992–1997 and was President of Lockheed Martin's International Launch Services from 1999–2006.

Albrecht was born in St. Louis, Missouri. He is credited in government with reform of NASA and implementation of the "faster, cheaper, better" approach to space development and in the space launch business is credited for inventing and implementing the concept of "mutual backup" that revolutionized commercial space launch. Albrecht was awarded the NASA Distinguished Service Medal and the DOD distinguished civilian service medal and is the recipient of the Space Pioneer award of the National Space Society. He is or has been on many corporate and advisory boards.

He has three children, one of them is Alexander "Alex" Albrecht, host of the Diggnation, Totally Rad Show, and Project Lore podcasts.

External links
Appointment of Mark Albrecht as Director of the National Space Council

1950 births
Living people
Businesspeople from St. Louis
University of California, Los Angeles alumni